Aihara (written: 相原 or 粟飯原) is a Japanese surname. Notable people with the surname include:

, Japanese manga artist
, Japanese politician
, Japanese manga artist
, Japanese gymnast
, Japanese footballer
 Yusuke Aihara (born 1994), Japanese professional vert skater
, Japanese gymnast

Fictional characters
 Aihara is used as an alias for Shuichi Aizawa in Death Note
 Kotoko Aihara, the female protagonist in Itazura na Kiss
 Aihara Mei and Aihara Yuzu in Citrus (manga)
, a character in anime and manga series Haikyū!!

Japanese-language surnames